The British School of Beijing, Shunyi is an international school in Shunyi District, Beijing, China. 

Nord Anglia Education operates this school, situated in the residential area of Shunyi and taking pupils from 18 months through to 18 years of age (Pre-Nursery students through to Sixth form college),  along with its sister school, The British School of Beijing, Sanlitun, based in the central Embassy district of Sanlitun and catering to students from the ages of 2 to 11.

As of 2012 the British School of Beijing, then a single school composed of two campuses, was the second largest international school in Beijing. The following year it was divided into two separate schools.

History 
The school was founded in 2003. It was originally intended to open in September 2004, but it opened on 29 March 2004 as prospective families were already in Beijing.

Originally both Nord Anglia campuses in Beijing, Shunyi and Sanlitun, were operated as a single school, The British School of Beijing (北京英国国际学校). In 2013 they were administratively made into separate institutions.

BSB, as of 2013, sends teachers to rural China to help area Chinese students, and teachers from rural China go to BSB to get assistance. The Chinese central government had selected BSB for this role.

Curriculum

The school offers an enhanced English National Curriculum. The curriculum is taught by UK qualified teachers and supported by teaching assistants. The school prepares students for the IGCSE, and IB Diploma Programme.

Students in the primary levels study Mandarin Chinese and may choose to take a second foreign language. Secondary students must study Mandarin and another foreign language.

The school offers a German Primary Programme for German-speaking primary school students in Klasse 1 to 4 to study core subjects in German, following the Thuringia Curriculum, while integrating into the English National Curriculum with non-core subjects and a variety of whole school activities.

Student body
As of 2011 the whole BSB school had 1,150 students from 50 countries. Many of the parents work for embassies and/or multinational corporations. The British made up the largest group of students at BSB, about 25% of the total. The Mainland European nationalities together totaled 30%, and the third-largest grouping originated from North America.

As of 2016, BSB Shunyi's maximum capacity is 1500 students and students came from over 60 nationalities including British, German, American, South Korean and Hong Kong etc.

Location

The British School of Beijing has two campuses. The Sanlitun campus comprises two buildings in downtown Beijing in the Embassy district. One building caters for Pre-Nursery and Nursery students (age 2 – 4), the other is from Reception to Year 6 (age 5 – 11). The other larger campus is situated in the rural area of Shunyi, approximately 45 minutes out of central Beijing. This campus caters for students from Pre-Nursery to Sixth Form College (18 months – 18 years).

Facilities

Both Nord Anglia schools host a wide range of facilities including a library, a gymnasium, a football pitch, tennis and basketball courts, and indoor sports dome. There is a theatre in each school, and a 230-seat amphitheatre in the Shunyi school. The Shunyi school also hosts tennis courts, an indoor swimming pool, fitness suite, dance studio, dedicated music rooms plus numerous private practice rooms, computer music suites, a recording studio, ICT suites, a Lego robotics lab, science laboratories and art studios. The Sanlitun school uses an Astroturf play area, and it has a football (soccer) pitch on the roof.

As of 2014 one of the BSB schools has an inflatable dome for athletics events in order to shield students from Beijing pollution.

School governance

The schools are part of the Nord Anglia Education group, a British organisation founded in 1972 specialising in education.

Notable Events

BSB is the Guinness World RecordsTM Holder for “The Largest Mathematical Jigsaw Puzzle” 
The British School of Beijing, Shunyi (BSB) is the official Guinness World RecordsTM Holder for "The Largest Mathematical Jigsaw Puzzle" in the world with a new record of 3,348 completed pieces achieved on 31 October 2015. The puzzle, containing 5200 pieces and more than 9000 equations, was created by (former Head of Mathematics Department) Simon Alles and required the participation of students of all ages within the school to complete. The attempt was carried out over a 24-hour period and raised almost 23000 RMB for a local charity.

Juilliard-Nord Anglia Performing Arts Programme 
On 3 December 2015, The British School of Beijing, Sanlitun and The British School of Beijing, Shunyi announced that they will become two of the first schools in the world to benefit from a new collaboration between Nord Anglia Education and The Juilliard School in New York. From September 2016, students at the schools will benefit from an enhanced embedded arts curriculum developed by specialists from Juilliard, along with continued support from, and engagement with, Juilliard alumni and affiliated artists.

On 21 March 2016, Andrea Lee, Music Curriculum Specialist and professional musician from The Juilliard School, attended and performed at the Press Conference held at the British School of Beijing, Shunyi to introduce the new collaboration.

UK National Space Academy at The British School of Beijing, Shunyi 
On 14 March 2016, UK and China launched an innovative teacher training programme using space science to inspire secondary students, piloting at the British School of Beijing, (BSB) Shunyi. The UK's National Space Academy Director, Anu Ojha and his team of UK's top space scientists and science teachers delivered a set of masterclasses for BSB teachers and students, and selected Chinese schools' teachers and students held at BSB.
Honourable guests who attended the opening ceremony at BSB included Colin Crooks, Prosperity Minister Counselor of the British Embassy, Professor Yu Junsheng from Beijing University of Posts and Telecommunications, representatives from Chaoyang Education Authority, Anu Ojha, Director of UK's National Space Academy and the leadership team of BSB.

Athletics
The British School of Beijing competes against other top international schools from across Asia and is involved in a variety of leagues including; ACAMIS (Association of China and Mongolia International Schools), ISAC (International School's Athletic Conference Beijing/Tianjin), JISAC (Junior International Schools Athletic Conference) and FOBISIA( Federation of British International Schools in Asia). The British School of Beijing has hosted the Primary FOBISSEA Games in 2011 and 2012, the FOBISSEA Music Festival in 2012 and the FOBISSEA Primary Performing Arts Carnival in 2013. The British School of Beijing, Shunyi hosted the Virtual FOBISIA Swimming Championship on 1-31 March 2022 with a total of 48 schools registered from 10 different Asian countries and a total of 1355 students participated.

Professional affiliations

FOBISIA (Federation of British International Schools in Asia)
JISAC (Junior International Schools Athletic Conference)
ISAC (Beijing and Tianjin International Schools Athletic Conference)
ACAMIS (Association of China and Mongolia International Schools)
BSB is registered at the Beijing Civil Affairs Bureau and teaches the English National Curriculum to foreign students as approved by the Ministry of Education of the People's Republic of China, and managed by Beijing Education Commission.
BSB is part of the Nord Anglia Education schools groups and is inspected by Nord Anglia's team of UK government trained OFSTED inspectors (Office for Standards in Education, Children's Services and Skills).
BSB is inspected successfully by the ISI (Independent Schools Inspectorate),  an inspectorate approved by the UK Government Department for Education, and BSB is an officially accredited British Schools Overseas. 
BSB is granted Accredited Member Status with COBIS (Council of British International Schools).  
BSB is an approved Cambridge International Examinations Testing Centre  and Edexcel Testing Centre, which authorise BSB for the International General Certificate of Secondary Education (IGCSE).
BSB is an authorized College Board SAT Testing Centre  for those students heading to American Universities.
For students studying Mandarin Chinese, BSB is an approved examination centre for the Hanyu Shuiping Kaoshi HSK, translated as the Chinese Proficiency Test .
BSB is an IB World School approved for the IB Diploma Programme

See also
 Education in Beijing
 Britons in China

References

Further reading 
"What is life like at the British School in Beijing?" BBC News School Report. 26 March 2014.

External links

 British School of Beijing 

International schools in Beijing
International Baccalaureate schools in China
British international schools in China
2003 establishments in China
Educational institutions established in 2003
High schools in Beijing
Schools in Shunyi District
Schools in Chaoyang District, Beijing
Nord Anglia Education